Enah Johnscott (born Enah John Scott, 24 March 1982) is a Cameroonian movie director and producer. Movies done by Johnscot include Triangle of tears (2011), Decoded (2012), Whispers (2013), The African Guest (2013),The Fisherman's Diary (2020) and Half Heaven (2022). He directed the television series Samba (2016) and Apple For Two (2017). Johnscot gained international audience as a director for his 2013 movie My Gallery featuring Ghanaian born actor John Dumelo and Decoded featuring Ghanain Van Vicker. The Fisherman's Diary was selected as the Cameroonian entry for the Best International Feature Film at the 93rd Academy Awards.

Career 
Johnscot's first movie was Triangle of tears in 2011. One of his works was nominated by FESPACO 2017 list of films competition in Burkina Faso for TV series Samba. In 2015, he won best director for the movie Rose on the Grave by Eleganzza Entertainment Awards in Cameroon.
His work was nominated for the 8th edition of Ecrans Noirs 2014 in movies such as my Gallery and Viri.

See also 
List of Cameroonian Actors
Cinema of Cameroon

References

External links 
 

Cameroonian male actors
Cameroonian film producers
Living people
Cameroonian film directors
1982 births